Arcadians can refer to:

 Arcadians, an ancient Greek tribe of the namesake region.
 Residents of Arcadia, Greece
 The Arcadians (choir), a choir in Oxford, England
 The Arcadians (musical), a 1909 long-running musical theatre comedy
 Arcadians (video game), a 1982 computer game by Acornsoft for the BBC Micro and Acorn Electron
 Arcadians (theater group) a theater group located in Wollongong, Australia

See also
 Arcadia (disambiguation)
 Arcadian (disambiguation)
 Acadians, descendants of the French settlers in Quebec